Indore Marathon is an annual marathon race organised in Indore, Madhya Pradesh, India. It is organised by Indore Municipal Corporation as Reliance Jio as its title sponsor. Every Year Participants from all over Indore & from the country take part in the Marathon.

It is established in 2015 with the motto of Healthy and Smart Indore.

Half Marathon 

The Half Marathon (21 km) starts from outside Nehru Stadium after passing through Geeta Bhawan, Palasia, LIG Square, Teen Puliya, LIG Square, Vijay Nagar and will end at Nehru Stadium.

10 Km Marathon 

The 10 km Marathon starts from outside Nehru Stadium after passing through Geeta Bhawan, Palasia, LIG Square,  Pardesipura and  will end at Nehru Stadium.

Prize money 

Rs. 50,000 each for international male winner and international female winner for Half Marathon. Rs. 30, 000 each for international male winner and international female winner for 10 km Marathon and no prize money for 5 km  Marathon.

References

External links 
 Indore Marathon

Sport in Indore
Marathons in India
Recurring sporting events established in 2015
2015 establishments in Madhya Pradesh